"Flower, Wind and You" is a song by South Korean singers, Ki Hui-hyeon, Jeon Somi, Choi Yoo-jung and Chungha. The single was released on 29 August 2016, by MBK Entertainment.

Background
After the finale of Produce 101, it was announced that eliminated contestant Ki Hui-hyeon, would collaborate with I.O.I members, Chungha, Choi Yoo-jung and Jeon So-mi.

Composition
"Flower, Wind and You" was written by 똘아이박, Peterpan and singer Ki Hui-hyeon.

Release
The single was released on August 29, 2016, through several music portals.

Music video
The music video was released on 29 August 2016, on MBK Entertainment's YouTube channel. Teasers were released prior to the date, and it stars DIA and I.O.I member Jung Chae-yeon.

Charts

Sales

Download

|}

References

2016 songs
Korean-language songs
2016 singles
Chungha songs